The Secret Life of Nora is a Malaysian musical produced by Enfiniti (M) Sdn Bhd, with Tiara Jacquelina as Executive Producer, story by Raymond Miranda, directed by Steven Dexter and choreographed by Pat Ibrahim. The show is an adaptation of the 1965 Shaw Brothers film Nora Zain - Agen Wanita 001.

Production 
The production was staged at the Malaysian National Theatre, Istana Budaya from 29 September - 16 October 2011 in Bahasa Malaysia and English.

Synopsis 
Nora (Tiara Jacquelina), the prima donna of a Malaysian cabaret, is tricked into becoming a spy to help uncover a mysterious plot by villain Mr J (Aznil Nawawi). Along the way, she falls in love with Roger Foss (Ryan Silverman), an international agent who helps transform her from Drama Queen to a skilled undercover spy.

Music 
The Secret Life Nora features an original score, music composed by Weng Onn San, lyrics written by Jerome Kugan with Alfian Sa'at and Mamat Khalid, arranged and directed by Roslan Aziz.

The original cast recording was released as a digital download on April 28, 2020.

Track listing

Casts 

 Tiara Jacquelina as Nora
Ryan Silverman as Roger Foss
 Aznil Nawawi as Mr J
 Adibah Noor as Khatijah
Tony Eusoff as Farouk
Aaron Khaled as Sharif
 Stephanie Van Driesen as Betty
 Mamat Khalid as Hong Kong

Ensemble / Company:

 Suhaili Micheline
 Iedil Dzuhrie Alaudin
 Nadia Aqilah
Nasz Sally

Video-On-Demand 
The Secret Life Of Nora is the first Malaysian show to be streamed online

During the Movement Control Order (MCO) for COVID-19 in March - April 2020, 40% of the collections for the streaming of The Secret Life of Nora on their Vimeo On Demand channel was channelled to MaybankHeart's The People Campaign is a relief fund for the most at-risk communities.

Awards 
The Secret Life of Nora won several awards at the 9th BOH Cameronian Arts Awards 2012.

 Kakiseni Audience Choice Awards for Musical Theatre
 Best Original Book And/Or Lyrics (Raymond Miranda, Mamat Khalid, Elliot Davis, Steven Dexter and Alfian Sa’at)
 Best Performance In A Supporting Role (Stephanie Van Driesen)

External links 

 Enfiniti Official Website

References

2011 musicals
Malaysian musicals